A DLS format (from Downloadable Sound) is any of the standardized file formats for digital musical instrument sound banks (collections of virtual musical instrument programs). The DLS standards also include detailed specifications for how MIDI protocol-controlled music synthesizers should render the instruments in a DLS file. As a result, DLS can also be considered primarily a synthesizer specification and only secondarily a file format.

The current DLS standards were developed first by the Interactive Audio Special Interest Group (IASIG), and then by the MIDI Manufacturers Association (MMA). Any future versions of DLS would be developed through the MMA working group process. The DLS specifications are published in English by the MMA and in Japanese by Association of Musical Electronics Industry (AMEI).

The DLS family is closely related to the proprietary SoundFonts format from Creative Labs. All versions of DLS to date are based on sample-based synthesis, however in principle the DLS file format could be used to represent instrument definitions for other sound synthesis techniques. "DLS" is an acronym for "Downloadable Sounds", and also the initials of DLS 1 project leader Dave Sparks of Creative Labs.

To date there have been three major versions of DLS:
 DLS 1: Basic single-oscillator synthesizer voice, for PCs and PC sound cards
 DLS 2: Adds per-voice lowpass filter + other enhancements
 Mobile DLS: Reduced feature set and memory requirements, for mobile phones

DLS is supported by the music synthesizers built into Windows and Mac OS X. Creative Labs sound cards for PCs support DLS. Numerous software music synthesizer products support DLS either natively or as an import format.

DLS has been incorporated into other standards. The MMA's Extended RMID format encapsulates DLS 1 or DLS 2 files with a Standard MIDI File using the RIFF (Resource Interchange File Format) container technology. The MMA's XMF Type 0 and 1 formats encapsulate DLS 1 or DLS 2 files with Standard MIDI Files using the XMF (Extensible Music Format) container technology.  The MMA's Mobile XMF format encapsulates zero or one Mobile DLS file and one Standard MIDI File using the XMF container technology. Mobile DLS is an optional media type in the 3GPP mobile phone standards starting from Release 6.

See also
SoundFont

External links
Specifications for DLS 1.x, DLS 2.x, and Mobile DLS
MMA list of DLS products and tools
Electronic Musician article on Downloadable Sounds

Official MIDI Standards Organizations
MIDI Manufacturers Association (MMA) - Source for English-language MIDI specs
Association of Musical Electronics Industry (AMEI) -Source for Japanese-language MIDI specs

Computer standards
Video game music file formats
Electronic musical instruments
DLS format
Music notation file formats
Software synthesizers